Base Aérea de Belém – ALA9  is a base of the Brazilian Air Force, located in Belém, Brazil.

It shares some facilities with Val-de-Cans/Júlio Cezar Ribeiro International Airport.

History
Belém Air Force Base has its origins on the 7th Aviation Regiment created on 30 June 1936. The provisory facility was located in the neighborhood ou Souza and it was only in 1938 that the construction of an aerodrome in the neighborhood of Val-de-Cans begun. The Air Force Base was created on 21 August 1944 by Decree 6,814.

Starting in 1958, with the creation of the Correio Aéreo Nacional da Amazônia in Belém, an Air Force organization focused in integration and humanitarian services, the Base gained vital importance as a base for the integration of the Amazonian region with the rest of the country.

Units
The following units are based at Belém Air Force Base:
 1st Squadron of the 3rd Aviation Group (3°/7°GAv) Netuno, using the P-95BM Bandeirulha.
 1st Squadron of Air Transportation (1°ETA) Tracajá, using the C-95BM & CM Bandeirante, C-97 Brasília, and the C-98A Grand Caravan.
 1st Squadron of Helicopters for General Use in the North of the Brazilian Navy (HU41) Hipogrifo, using the UH-15 Super Cougar.

Access
The base is located 12 km from downtown Belém.

Gallery
This gallery displays aircraft that are or have been based at Belém. The gallery is not comprehensive.

Present aircraft

Retired aircraft

See also
List of Brazilian military bases
Val-de-Cans/Júlio Cezar Ribeiro International Airport

References

External links

Pará
Brazilian Air Force
Brazilian Air Force bases
Buildings and structures in Pará
Belém
Airfields of the United States Army Air Forces Air Transport Command on the South Atlantic Route
Airfields of the United States Army Air Forces